Pierre Fernand Bodein (born December 30, 1947, in Obernai) is a French criminal and spree killer who, since 1969, has alternated stays between psychiatric hospitals and prisons. Nicknamed "Pierrot le fou" meaning "Pierre the fool", his criminal record includes seven convictions, three of which are murders, including violent rapes. He is the 11th child of a family of 16 children, descending from a Yenish community.

Crimes 
After his first prison term, served in 1969, Bodein, a member of a family of "basket makers" (names for travelers settled in Alsace) would have many other stays in prisons, including for robbery, theft and robbery but also for sexual assault. In 1976, due to his health state he was deemed "incompatible for detention". A psychiatric director at the time, Michel Patris, said this about him: "He was in a vegetative state, frozen, shutting himself in silence." Bodein swallowed his excrements, and was now moved in a wheelchair. Released in 1980, he resumed his robberies. He was re-arrested in 1989, and was again considered crazy. According to psychiatrist Henri Brunner, "all psychiatric experts on that date considered Bodein crazy, myself included.".

In December 1992, he left his wheelchair to escape through a skylight of the psychiatric hospital in Erstein, which had remained open. In a span of three days, he took two women hostage, before sequestering and raping one of them, robbing a bank and armory afterwards. He also attacked several gendarme checkpoints and shot at two policemen, wounding one of them seriously before being intercepted. This event, widely relayed by the media, earned him the nickname "Pierrot le fou".

He was sentenced in 1994 to 30 years imprisonment for these crimes, but was retried in February 1996 on appeal by the cour d'assises of Bas-Rhin, which re-sentenced him to 28 years imprisonment (it was further reduced to 20 years in cassation) in 1996. Bodein then adopted a new strategy, and was described as a "model inmate". Due to his good behaviour, years of pretrial detention, automatic sentencing and remission, he was released on parole on March 14, 2004, a few months before the end of his sentence. He then began living in his brother's caravan, who was  a scrap dealer in Bourgheim.

Four months later, Bodein was charged with the kidnapping, rape and murder of 38-year-old Hedwige Vallée, stabbed to death on June 21; 10-year-old Jeanne-Marie Kegelin, found on June 29 and 14-year-old Julie Scharsch, found on July 3. He was first arrested on June 26 before being released for a lack of evidence, but was rearrested and charged on June 30. Some psychiatrists speculated that these constituted substitutes for his own daughter and one of his fellow prisoners, with whom he had established an "obscene" correspondence. He denied the accusations and defended his innocence, but the DNA evidence proved him guilty.

List of known victims

Trial and sentencing 
On April 11, 2007, the trial of Bodein began at the cour d'assises in Strasbourg, in an adjoining room of the court specifically arranged for the occasion. The "real" life imprisonment sentence (in France the maximum imprisonment is at most 30 years, but in this it was true life imprisonment) was imposed on him on July 4, 2007. The jurors accepted the General Counsel's decision a week later. He was the first prisoner in France to be sentenced to life imprisonment, followed up a year later by Michel Fourniret in May 2008, then in January 2015 by Nicolas Blondiau. His appeal was rejected by the court of Colmar on October 2, 2008. On January 21, 2010, his appeal of cassation was rejected by the Court of Cassation, finalizing his sentence.

The complicity of Fuhrmann and Remetter, two fellow Yenish people, in the kidnapping, murder and rape of Jeanne-Marie Kegelin was not retained, but the Attorney General demanded they receive sentences ranging from 3 to 30 years. The Kegelin family, defended by Wallerand de Saint-Just, denounced a "mess in the procedures that prevented their mourning". The lawyer also felt that "those who, by their spirit, their politics and their abstention, allowed the death of Jeanne-Marie Kegelin are much more responsible than Pierre Bodein."

On November 13, 2014, the European Court of Human Rights said that the conviction of Bodein did not violate Article 3 (the convicted person alleged that the sentence was inhumane and with degrading treatment), nor Article 6 (Bodein complained about the lack of motives of the cour d'assises' judges) of the European Convention of Human Rights.

References

Press articles 

 "The trial of Pierre Bodein revives the debate on recidivism" Article by Emmanuelle Reju published April 11, 2007, in La Croix.
 "'Pierrot le fou' the ordeal of Jeanne-Marie" Article published on April 12, 2007, in Le Nouvel observateur.
 "Pierre Bodein is seen as a victim" Article by Sophie Bouniot published April 12, 2007, in L'Humanité.
 "The plight of the victims of Pierre Bodein" Article by Jeanne Mahé published April 13, 2007, in 20 minutes.
 "Pierre Bodein convicted, sixteen other defendants acquitted" Article by Marie Marty published July 12, 2007, in  Le Parisien.
 "Bodein, crazy or psychopath?" Article by Benjamin Bonneau published September 8, 2008, in Le Journal du dimanche.
 "Pierre Bodein sentenced to the maximum penalty" Article published October 2, 2008, in Le Figaro.
 "Incompressible perpetuity for Pierre Bodein" Article published October 3, 2008, in L'Express.
 "The Republican Lorraine" Article published March 17, 2014, in Le Républicain lorrain.
 "Serial killer 'Pierrot the madman' challenges the real perpetuity before the European justice" Article published November 11, 2014, in 20 minutes.
 "Pierre Bodein against real life" Article published November 12, 2014, in Le Dauphiné libéré.
 "Pierrot the foul denounces the sentences as "death"" Article by Anthony Verdot-Belaval published November 13, 2014, in Paris Match.
 "Seizure by Bodein, the ECHR validates the incomprehensible perpetuity" Article by Gilbert Reilhac and Yves Clarisse published November 13, 2014, in Capital.
 "Pierrot le fou. His life sentence is considered" Article published November 13, 2014, in Ouest-France.
 "The Bodein case: the ECHR the "real life practice" in France" Article published November 13, 2014, in La Dépêche du Midi.
 "Incarcerated in Moulins-Yzeure, 'Pierrot le fou' calls for  a less strict prison regime" Article by Christian Lefèvre published February 5, 2016, in La Montagne.

TV documentaries 

 "Pierre Bodein, Pierrot le fou" in January 2006, October 2007 and June 2010 on Get the Accused presented by Christophe Hondelatte on France 2.
 " Pierrot le fou " (first report) in « ... in Alsace » on June 13 and 24, 2013 on Crimes on NRJ 12.
 "Pierrot le fou affair, autopsy of a murderous course" (first report) on February 7, 14 and 22, 2015 in Chronique Criminelles on NT1.
 "Pierre Bodein AKA 'Pierrot le fou'" on Crimes à l'Est on France 3.

See also

Related articles 

 List of rampage killers

External links 

 INA archive, French TV newscast on July 5, 2004, duration: 2 minutes and 22 seconds
 INA archive, France 2 newscast on April 10, 2007, duration: 2 minutes and 16 seconds
 INA archive, France 3 newscast on June 21, 2007, duration: 1 minute and 53 seconds
 INA archive, France 2 newscast on July 11, 2007, duration: 2 minutes and 24 seconds

Living people
1947 births
French spree killers
French rapists
Murder in France
Yenish people